Stenoptilia wagneri is a moth of the family Pterophoridae. It is found in Iran.

References

Moths described in 1940
wagneri
Moths of the Middle East